Bowling is a sports video game published in 1979 by Atari, Inc. for the Atari VCS (later renamed the Atari 2600). It was programmed by Larry Kaplan who left Atari to co-found Activision the same year. The game is an interpretation of the sport bowling, playable by one or two players.

Gameplay

In all six variations, games last for 10 frames, or turns.  At the start of each frame, the current player is given two chances to roll a bowling ball down an alley in an attempt to knock down as many of the ten bowling pins as possible.  The bowler (on the left side of the screen) may move up and down his end of the alley to aim before releasing the ball.  In four of the game's six variations, the ball can be steered before it hits the pins.  Knocking down every pin on the first shot is a strike, while knocking every pin down in both shots is a spare.  The player's score is determined by the number of pins knocked down in all 10 frames, as well as the number of strikes and spares acquired.

Variations
Odd-numbered variants are one player games, while two players alternate on frames in even-numbered games.

 Games 1/2: The bowling ball can be moved in one direction after being thrown.
 Games 3/4: The bowling ball can be moved up and down after being thrown.
 Games 5/6: The ball moves straight and cannot be moved.

Reception
Bowling was reviewed by Video magazine in its "Arcade Alley" column where it was praised as "an enjoyable version of a sport that is perfectly suited to the video arcade format". The reviewers singled out the graphics (including the automatic frame-by-frame scoring and "deft" character animation) as "one of the game's best points".

See also

List of Atari 2600 games

References

External links
Bowling at Atari Mania

1979 video games
Atari games
Atari 2600 games
Bowling video games
Multiplayer and single-player video games
Video games developed in the United States